Protorohippus (Latin: "before" (pro), + Greek: "mountain" (oros), "horse" (hippos)) is an extinct equid that lived in the Eocene of North America.

See also

 Evolution of the horse

References

Eocene horses
Eocene odd-toed ungulates
Prehistoric placental genera
Eocene mammals of North America